Duchesne Municipal Airport  is a dual-runway airport located in Duchesne, Utah. It was opened in May 1945 and is operated by the City of Duchesne.

Operations
Most aircraft movements at the airport are carried out by privately owned light aircraft, including those based and those transiting on business or pleasure flights.

References

External links

Buildings and structures in Duchesne County, Utah
Airports in Utah
Transportation in Duchesne County, Utah
Airports established in 1945
1945 establishments in Utah